Lowa River may refer to:

 Lowa (Kivu/Maniema), a tributary of the Lualaba in DR Congo in the Kivu and Maniema provinces
 Lowa (Katanga), a tributary of the Lualaba in DR Congo in the Katanga Province, better known as Luvua